Youri Mulder (born 23 March 1969) is a Dutch football manager and former player who played as a striker.

Club career
Mulder was born in Brussels, Belgium. The son of former Ajax Amsterdam and R.S.C. Anderlecht player Jan Mulder, he played youth football for SDO Bussum and Ajax. After two years in amateur football, he made his professional debuts at 21, with FC Twente. In his second season, he scored a career-best 18 goals, as the club finished sixth in the Eredivisie.

In 1993, Mulder moved to the German Bundesliga with FC Schalke 04, where he would play for nearly one decade. He made his league debut on 7 August, in a 0–3 loss at SG Wattenscheid 09. His first three years at the Gelsenkirchen side were successful individually – 22 goals combined – and the 1996–97 season brought with it the UEFA Cup conquest, with the player netting three times in the campaign, including once in the quarter-finals against Valencia CF.

Additionally, Mulder also won two consecutive German Cups, in 2001 and 2002. Only managing to appear 33 times (with just one goal) in his last three seasons combined, he retired at the end of 2001–02, aged 33.

In 2007–08, Mulder had his first coaching experience: he started the season as an offensive trainer in Twente, then rejoined another former side, Schalke 04, in April 2008, working with former teammate Michael Büskens as replacements for dismissed Mirko Slomka, a situation which occurred again in 2009, after the sacking of Fred Rutten, being joined then by another former club player, Oliver Reck.

International career
Mulder played nine matches for the Netherlands national football team, and found the net three times. He made his international debut on 16 November 1994, and participated at UEFA Euro 1996, where he played the last ten minutes (plus extra time) in the quarterfinal loss against France.

Personal life
Youri Mulder is the son of Dutch footballer Jan Mulder who played for Anderlecht and Ajax. 

In addition to his professional football career, Mulder also worked as a sports commentator for NOS TV.
he was married with Nina Freidher, and they have two kids: Finn and Alexander Mulder. Where as now Finn lives in Norway.
Alexander Mulder goes to school in 2021 for the last year. He recently celebrated being a member of a group called "Billy Boys 2021". 

For 15 years, Mulder was one of the Dutch commentators on the popular football game FIFA.

Honours
Schalke
DFB-Pokal: 2000–01, 2001–02
UEFA Cup: 1996–97

Books
Ingo Schiweck, Kicken beim Feind? Der ganz alltägliche Friede hinter dem deutsch-niederländischen Fußballkrieg, Düsseldorf 2006 (in German)

References

External links
 Beijen profile 
 
 

1969 births
Living people
Footballers from Brussels
Dutch footballers
Association football forwards
Eredivisie players
SDO Bussum players
FC Twente players
Bundesliga players
FC Schalke 04 players
UEFA Cup winning players
Netherlands international footballers
UEFA Euro 1996 players
Dutch expatriate footballers
Dutch expatriate sportspeople in Germany
Expatriate footballers in Germany
Dutch football managers
Dutch association football commentators
FC Twente non-playing staff